The Statute Law Revision Act 1887 (50 & 51 Vict c 59) is an Act of the Parliament of the United Kingdom.

This Act was partly in force in Great Britain at the end of 2010.

The enactments which were repealed (whether for the whole or any part of the United Kingdom) by this Act were repealed so far as they extended to the Isle of Man on 25 July 1991.

This Act was retained for the Republic of Ireland by section 2(2)(a) of, and Part 4 of Schedule 1 to, the Statute Law Revision Act 2007.

The Schedule to this Act was repealed by section 1 of, and the Schedule to, the Statute Law Revision Act 1908 (8 Edw 7 c 49).

See also
Statute Law Revision Act

References
The Public General Acts passed in the fiftieth and fifty-first years of the reign of Her Majesty Queen Victoria. HMSO. London. 1887. Pages 307 to 322.

External links
List of amendments and repeals in the Republic of Ireland from the Irish Statute Book.

United Kingdom Acts of Parliament 1887